Willie Calvin Clark, Jr. is a former professional American football cornerback who played for the San Diego Chargers (1994–1996, 1998) and the Philadelphia Eagles (1997) in the National Football League. He currently is the Executive Director of Secondary Education for the Manatee County School District in Manatee County, Florida.

References

1972 births
Living people
Players of American football from New Haven, Connecticut
Sportspeople from New Haven, Connecticut
American football cornerbacks
Notre Dame Fighting Irish football players
San Diego Chargers players
Philadelphia Eagles players
Notre Dame Fighting Irish men's track and field athletes